The 2019 Latvian Football Cup was the 25th edition of the football tournament. The competition began on 22 May 2019 and ended on 26 October 2019. Riga FC were the defending champions, having won the previous year's final over Ventspils 5–4 in a penalty shoot–out.

Format
Forty–five clubs participated in this season's Latvian Football Cup. Each round was played over one leg with matches which were level at the end of regulation proceeding to extra time and afterwards to penalties, when needed, to determine the winning club.

First round
Eight first round matches were played 22–31 May 2019.

|}

Second round
Fourteen second round matches were played 12–21 June 2019.

|}

Third round
Seven third round matches were played 21–30 June 2019.

|}

Fourth round
Eight fourth round matches were played 13–17 July 2019.

|}

Quarter–finals
Four quarter–final matches were played from 4 August to 1 September 2019.

|}

Semi–finals
Two semi-final matches were played 25–26 September 2019.

|}

Final
The final was played on 26 October 2019.

See also
2019 Latvian Higher League

References

External links 
 LFF.lv
 uefa.com

Latvian Football Cup seasons
Latvian Football Cup
2019 in Latvian football